GMU may refer to:

 Gaelic medium unit (in Scottish education)
 George Mason University, in Virginia, United States
 IATA Airport Code for Greenville Downtown Airport, in South Carolina, United States
 Guangzhou Medical University, in China
 Guizhou Medical University, in China
 Gulf Medical University, in the UAE
 ISO language code for Gumalu language
 Guarded Memory Unit, a feature in Intel i960